Abalakovo is a rural locality (a selo) and the administrative center of Abalakovsky Selsoviet of Yeniseysky District, Krasnoyarsk Krai, Russia. The population was 1451 as of 2010. There are 25 streets.

Geography 
Abalakovo is located 62 km southeast of Yeniseysk (the district's administrative centre) by road. Ust-Tunguska is the nearest rural locality.

References 

Rural localities in Krasnoyarsk Krai
Yeniseysky District